Matthias Koehl Jr. (January 22, 1935 – October 9, 2014) was an American Marine, neo-Nazi politician and writer. He succeeded George Lincoln Rockwell as the longest serving leader of the American Nazi Party, from 1967 to 2014.

Like the Chilean diplomat Miguel Serrano, Koehl was influenced by the occultism of the Greek–French writer Savitri Devi. He was also a close friend of the Dutch World War II Nazi collaborator Florentine Rost van Tonningen.

Early life
Born on January 22, 1935, in Milwaukee, Wisconsin to Hungarian immigrants of German descent, Koehl studied journalism at the University of Wisconsin–Milwaukee  and played violin with the civic opera.  A teenage anti-Semitic activist, Koehl worked with hate groups on the East Coast  and the South before joining George Lincoln Rockwells infamous American Nazi Party. and served in the United States Marine Corps.

Politics
Koehl joined James Madole's National Renaissance Party, the United White Party, and the National States' Rights Party, before joining the American Nazi Party in 1960.

In 1953, he claimed to have met with poet and fascist-activist Ezra Pound during Pound's imprisonment at St. Elizabeths Hospital in Washington, D.C. In 1957, he became secretary-treasurer for the Committee to Free Ezra Pound. Pound gifted Koehl several signed volumes of his poetry during this period, signing them "Matthias Koehl / HEIL / Ezra Pound / 1953."

In August 1967, formerly a Deputy Commander, Koehl succeeded the assassinated George Lincoln Rockwell as Commander of the National Socialist White People's Party, known until December 1966 as the American Nazi Party. In 1983, Koehl renamed the organization "New Order." At the end of his life, Koehl was the leader of the World Union of National Socialists, despite his affiliation with Esoteric Nazism having alienated some members. Although he maintained a low public profile, Koehl granted an interview to mainstream writer William H. Schmaltz in Arlington, Virginia, in April 1996 during the preparation of Schmaltz' biography of George Lincoln Rockwell.

Death
Koehl died in the night between October 9 and 10, 2014, at the age of 79 of complications related to cancer.

Works
 Some Guidelines to the Development of the National Socialist Movement (1969)
 The Future Calls (1972)
 The Program of the National Socialist White People's Party  (Cicero, IL:  NS Publications, 1980)
 Faith of the Future (1995)

References

Sources
 Black Sun: Aryan Cults, Esoteric Nazism and the Politics of Identity by Nicholas Goodrick-Clarke, 2001,  (2)
 Hate: George Lincoln Rockwell and the American Nazi Party by William H. Schmaltz, 2000,  (review 1)
 American Fuehrer : George Lincoln Rockwell and the American Nazi Party by Frederick J. Simonelli, 1999,  and 
 Hitler's Priestess: Savitri Devi, the Hindu-Aryan Myth, and Neo-Nazism by Nicholas Goodrick-Clarke, 1998,

External links

 New Order webpage
 Who is Hitler?  transcript of remarks by Matt Koehl
 Populism And Socialism In American Nazism, chapter five of American Nazism In The Context Of The American Extreme Right: 1960–1978 by Jim Saleam
 Pierce, Koehl and the National Socialist White People's Party Internal Split of 1970 by H. Michael Barrett
 THE KU KLUX KLAN AND THE AMERICAN NAZI PARTY: CASE STUDIES IN TOTALITARIANISM AND FASCISM by Betty A. Dobratz and Stephanie Shanks-Meile
 Neo-Nazis: Longtime Hitlerian Activists on the Anti-Defamation League's website.
 FBI files obtained under the FOIA, hosted by the Internet Archive:
Chicago FBI office file part 1
Chicago FBI office file part 2
Chicago FBI office file part 3
Chicago FBI office file part 4
Chicago FBI office file part 5

1935 births
2014 deaths
20th-century far-right politicians in the United States
Military personnel from Milwaukee
American Nazi Party members
American people of German descent
American people of Hungarian descent
University of Wisconsin–Milwaukee alumni
United States Marines
20th-century American writers
American male writers
Writers from Milwaukee
American neo-Nazis
Neo-Nazi politicians in the United States